Walid Salah Abdel Latif  (born 11 November 1977 in Mansoura) is a retired Egyptian football player and a Zamalek international forward.

Career statistics

International goals

Honours
Egypt
African Cup of Nations: Winner 1998

Zamalek
Egyptian League Title (2000/2001 & 2002/2003 & 2003/2004)
Egyptian Cup Title (2001/2002)
Egyptian Super Cup (2000/2001 & 2001/2002)
African Champions League title (2002)
African Super Cup title (2002)
Arab Club Championship title (2003)
Egyptian Saudi Super Cup title (2003)

References

External links

1977 births
Living people
Egyptian footballers
Egypt international footballers
1998 African Cup of Nations players
Association football forwards
Zamalek SC players
People from Mansoura, Egypt
Egyptian Premier League players